1949–50 British Home Championship was one of the most significant competitions of the British Home Championship football tournament. This year saw the competition doubling up as Group 1 in the qualifying rounds for the 1950 FIFA World Cup. It was the first time that either England, Wales, Scotland or Ireland (IFA) had entered a World Cup competition. It was also a significant moment in the history of Irish football as it was the last time that the (Northern) Irish Football Association entered a team featuring players born in both Northern Ireland and what is now the Republic of Ireland.

Both England and Scotland began well, the Scots beating Ireland 8–2 at Windsor Park while England beat Wales 4–1 in Cardiff. Both teams continued their dominance in the second round of matches, Scotland beating Wales 2–0 whilst Ireland were again heavily defeated, this time losing 9–2 to England. In the final round of games Ireland and Wales gained some consolation points with a goalless draw while − England took first place by beating Scotland 1–0 in a hard-fought game in Glasgow.

World Cup qualifying
FIFA offered two places at the 1950 FIFA World Cup to the winners and runners up of the competition. However Scotland insisted they would only enter if they won the championship outright and even though they finished second, the Scottish FA declined the opportunity to enter a team in the World Cup finals for the first time. FIFA subsequently offered their place to both France, the runners-up in Group 3 and Ireland (FAI), the runners-up in Group 5. However both teams also declined the invitation. Despite winning the championship, England failed to impress at the World Cup. After defeating Chile 2–0 they then lost 1–0 to both the United States and Spain and failed to qualify for the second stage.

Last all-Ireland team
Until 1950 there were, in effect, two Ireland teams, chosen by two rival associations. Both associations, the Belfast-based IFA and the Dublin-based FAI claimed jurisdiction over the whole of Ireland and selected players from the whole island. As a result, several notable Irish players from this era played for both teams.

The game between the IFA XI and Wales at the Racecourse Ground, Wrexham on 8 March 1950 marked the end of an era in Irish football history. The result was irrelevant, as both teams had lost their previous games and had nothing to play for but pride. However, the 0–0 draw saw the IFA XI field an all-Ireland team for the last time. The team included four players - Tom Aherne, Reg Ryan, Davy Walsh and the captain, Con Martin - who were born in what is now the Republic of Ireland. Since this game was also a qualifier for the 1950 FIFA World Cup, the situation led to controversy. All four players had previously played for the FAI XI in their qualifiers. Both Martin and Walsh had even scored for the FAI XI. As a result, the four players actually played for two different associations in the same FIFA World Cup tournament.

FIFA intervened, after complaints from the FAI, and subsequently restricted players' eligibility based on the political border. In 1953 FIFA ruled neither team could be referred to as Ireland, decreeing that the FAI team be officially designated as the Republic of Ireland, while the IFA team was to become Northern Ireland. The IFA objected and in 1954 were permitted to continue using the name Ireland in the British Home Championship. This practice was discontinued in the late 1970s.

Table

Results

Team squads

Head coach:  Walter Winterbottom

Head coach: none, SFA Selection Committee

Head coach: none, managed by a committee

See also
1950 FIFA World Cup qualification
1950 FIFA World Cup

References

1949 in British sport
1949–50 in Welsh football
1950 in British sport
1949–50 in English football
1949–50 in Scottish football
1949–50 in Irish association football
1947-48
Group 1
Ireland national football team (1882–1950)
1949–50 in Northern Ireland association football
England at the 1950 FIFA World Cup